The Hai River (海河, lit. "Sea River"), also known as the Peiho,  ("White River"), or Hai Ho,  is a Chinese river connecting Beijing to Tianjin and the Bohai Sea.

The Hai River at Tianjin is formed by the confluence of five watercourses: the Southern Canal, Ziya River, Daqing River, Yongding River, and the Northern Canal. The southern and northern canals are parts of the Grand Canal. The Southern Canal is joined by the Wei River at Linqing. The Northern Canal joins with the Bai He (or Chaobai River) at Tongzhou. The Northern Canal (sharing a channel with Bai He) is also the only waterway from the sea to Beijing. Therefore, early Westerners also called the Hai He the Bai He.

At Tianjin, through the Grand Canal, the Hai connects with the Yellow and Yangtze rivers. The construction of the Grand Canal greatly altered the rivers of the Hai He basin.  Previously, the Wei, Ziya Yongding and Bai Rivers flowed separately to the sea.  The Grand Canal cut through the lower reaches of these rivers and fused them into one outlet to the sea, in the form of the current Hai He.

History

On 20 May 1858, the Pei-ho, as it was then known, was the scene of an invasion by Anglo-French forces during the Second Opium War whereby the Taku Forts were captured.  
 
In 1863 seagoing ships could reach the head of navigation at Tongzhou, but the crooked river was difficult for large vessels.
During the Boxer Rebellion, Imperial Chinese forces deployed a weapon called "electric mines" on June 15, at the Baihe river before the Battle of Taku Forts (1900), to prevent the western Eight-Nation Alliance from sending ships to attack. This was reported by American military intelligence in the United States. War Dept. by the United States. Adjutant-General's Office. Military Information Division.

Like the Yellow River, the Hai is exceedingly muddy because of the powdery soil through which it flows. The silt carried by the water deposits in the lower reaches, sometimes causing flooding. The waters from the five major tributaries only have one shallow outlet to the sea, which makes such floods stronger. Because China's capital (and second largest city), Beijing, and the third largest city, Tianjin, both lie in the Hai He Basin, Hai He floods cause a significant loss. To alleviate flooding, reservoirs have been built and artificial channels dug to divert excess water directly into the sea. For example, the Chaobai River is diverted to the Chaobai Xin River and no longer joins with the Northern Canal.

Due to industrial and urban development in the Hai He Basin, the volume of water flow has greatly decreased. Many smaller tributaries and some of the major tributaries are dry for most of the year. With reduced water flow, water pollution worsens. The water shortage in the Hai He basin is expected to be alleviated by the South-North Water Transfer Project.

See also
 Geography of China
 Taku (Peiho) Forts

References

Bibliography

Further reading
 Domagalski, J.L., et al. (2001). Comparative water-quality assessment of the Hai He River basin in the People's Republic of China and three similar basins in the United States [U.S. Geological Survey Professional Paper 1647]. Reston, VA: U.S. Department of the Interior, U.S. Geological Survey.

External links

Rivers of Beijing
Rivers of Tianjin
Rivers of Hebei
Rivers of Henan
Rivers of Inner Mongolia
Rivers of Shanxi
Rivers of Shandong